Pony Express Rider is a 1976 American Western film directed by Robert Totten and starring Henry Wilcoxon, Maureen McCormick and Joan Caulfield. In 1860 young Jimmie Richardson joins the Pony Express to help find the man he believes killed his father.

Plot

The year is 1860.  The United States is inexorably heading towards civil war.  Gold fever excites prospectors with wild dreams.  Pioneers are pushing the western frontier further.  Against these events, is the story of two rugged frontiersmen.  They are friends - Trevor Kingman is a rancher who lusts for power and Jed Richardson is a modest man who hopes to carve decency into the western wilds.

Kingman's pursuit of political fame and fortune eventually splits the friends.  The only link between them is the love that developed between Richardson's son, Jimmy D., and Kingman's daughter, Rose of Sharon.

When a feud develops between the two families, Bovey (Kingman's son) - in a moment of anger - murders Jed.  Jimmy D., despite his love for Rose, decides to avenge his father's death.  He sets out after Bovey, racing through the wilderness plains across Native American-held country.  By a chanceful opportunity Jimmy D. joins the Pony Express mail rider service.  It is through the Pony Express that he is able to ride across hostile territory in his vengeance mission.  Eventually, in uncharted territory, Jimmy D. gets his revenge.

Cast
 Stewart Petersen as Jimmie D. Richardson 
 Henry Wilcoxon as Trevor Kingman 
 Buck Taylor as Bovey Kingman 
 Maureen McCormick as Rose of Sharon 
 Ken Curtis as Jed Richardson 
 Joan Caulfield as Charlotte 
 Slim Pickens as Bob Jay 
 Dub Taylor as Boomer Riley 
 Ace Reid as Bullfrog Fry 
 Jack Elam as Crazy Charlie 
 Larry D. Mann as Blackmore 
 James Almanzar as Puddin 
 Bea Morris as Marquette Richardson 
 Tom Waters as Button Forehand 
 Cliff Brand as Capt. Billings 
 Bleu McKenzie as Yankee Bill 
 George Roland as Mr. Price 
 Scott Petersen as David Richardson 
 Harold Lee Thompson as Buddy Rhodes 
 Delmer Buddy Totten as Bobby Charles Richardson 
 Donna Jamison as Glee Ann 
 Dennis Lehane as Cpl. Ross 
 Bill Conklin as Smiles

References

Bibliography
 Monaco, James. The Encyclopedia of Film. Perigee Books, 1991.

External links
 

1976 films
1976 Western (genre) films
American Western (genre) films
Films directed by Robert Totten
Films set in the 19th century
Films set in Texas
1970s historical films
American historical films
1970s English-language films
1970s American films